The 2006 Winter Olympic Games Snowboarding competition consisted of men's and women's halfpipe, parallel giant slalom and snowboard cross events.

Medal summary

Medal table

Men's events

Women's events

Participating NOCs
Twenty-four nations competed in the snowboarding events at Torino.

References

 
2006 Winter Olympics events
2006 in snowboarding
2006
Olympics